Senki (戦旗, "Battle Flag") was a Japanese proletarian literary magazine in the late 1920s and early 1930s.

Overview 
Senki was a Japanese proletarian literary magazine published between May 1928 and December 1931.

Background 
The organization established Senki as the monthly organ and released its first issue in May of that year.

Publication history 
The first issue of Senki was published in May 1928. In December of the same year, its publisher NAPF was reorganized as the Japan Congress of Proletarian Artists' Organizations (全日本無産者芸術団体協議会 Zen-Nihon Musansha Geijutsu Dantai Kyōgikai, also abbreviated NAPF) and publication of Senki was taken over by the newly established Senki Company (戦旗社 Senki-sha). The magazine was therefore transformed from the official magazine of NAPF into a general magazine of political education, and in September of the following year the Senki Company became fully independent of NAPF.

Publication of the magazine ceased with the December 1931 issue.

Excluding issues that were banned by government censors, 43 issues of Senki entered print in the magazine's run. Supplements for a youth (Shōnen Senki 少年戦旗) and female audience (Fujin Senki 婦人戦旗) were also published. It suffered strict government censorship, and at the height of its popularity had a circulation of around 23,000.

Notable works 
Several important works of Japan's proletarian literature movement first saw print in the pages of Senki, including:
1928 nen 3 gatsu 15 nichi (November and December 1928)
Kani Kōsen (May and June 1929)
Taiyō no nai Machi (June, July, August, September and November 1929)

Reception and legacy 
Reprints of Senki were published between 1976 and 1977 by the Senki Reprint Publication Society (戦旗復刻版刊行会 Senki Fukkoku-ban Kankō-kai).

References

Works cited

External links

1928 establishments in Japan
1931 disestablishments in Japan
Defunct literary magazines published in Japan
Magazines established in 1928
Magazines disestablished in 1931
Magazines published in Tokyo
Proletarian literature
Communist magazines